Johannes Tomana (born 9 September 1967) is a Zimbabwean attorney and the Prosecutor-General from November 2013 until being dismissed in June 2017.

Background
He was originally appointed after the prosecuting and government advisory roles of the Attorney General were split under the new Constitution that came in effect in 2013. Previously he served as the Attorney-General, having been appointed to the position by Robert Mugabe on December 18, 2008. He previously served as deputy Attorney-General under Sobusa Gula-Ndebele from 2006 to May 2008 . Gula-Ndebele was dismissed from his post following infighting within the ZANU-PF. Bharat Patel, who served as acting Attorney-General from May to December 2008. Toamana is a member of Zimbabwes Anit-Corruption Commission since 2005.

Tomana's appointment in December 2008 was made (together with the appointment of the Governor of the Reserve Bank of Zimbabwe, Gideon Gono) without consulting the Movement for Democratic Change (MDC), the other part of the Zimbabwean inclusion government. It is heavily debated by the MDC.

He was placed on the United States sanctions list in 2010.

References

Attorneys-General of Zimbabwe
Living people
20th-century Zimbabwean lawyers
Members of the Senate of Zimbabwe
1967 births
21st-century Zimbabwean lawyers